Barilla Hellas A.E., known by its domestic trade name MISKO, is a Greek company, owned by Barilla Group, that produces and sells pasta in Greece. It also serves other parts of the world, particularly the Greek diaspora.

MISKO, the largest pasta producer in Greece, was founded in Piraeus in 1927 and was acquired by Barilla in 1991, selling Barilla's pasta and sauces along its own product line-up. In 2000, the company built a new production facility in Boeotia which is the third largest in Europe.

Logo
The current logo was introduced in 1997 and features the durum wheat. For Misko's most used basic products, the color of  packaging is magenta. Other products are named as golden series, extra fine series, whole grain series, etc...

See also
List of companies in Greece

References

External links
 http://www.misko.gr/

Manufacturing companies based in Athens
Greek pasta companies
Greek brands
Barilla (company)
Greek subsidiaries of foreign companies